In comics, Zola may refer to:

 Zola (DC Comics), a character in Wonder Woman stories
 Arnim Zola, a Marvel Comics mad scientist

See also
 Zola (disambiguation)
 Zola (name)